The Kwita Izina Cycling Tour was a multi-day road cycling race in Rwanda that was held annually from 2009 until 2012. It was part of UCI Africa Tour as a 2.2 event for the final two editions.

Three of the four editions of the race were won by Abraham Ruhumuriza, while the 2011 edition was won by Daniel Teklehaymanot of Eritrea.

Winners

References

Cycle races in Rwanda
2009 establishments in Rwanda
Recurring sporting events established in 2009
Recurring sporting events disestablished in 2012
UCI Africa Tour races
Defunct cycling races in Rwanda